Hazel Wong is an architect. She lives and works in the United Arab Emirates.

Life and work
Hazel Wong was born in Hong Kong. She previously lived in Canada and the United States before her current place of residence in the United Arab Emirates.

Emirates Towers 
The Emirates Towers, designed in 1998  and completed in 2000, has attributed considerable recognition to architect, Hazel Wong. The seed of the towers' creation was planted in 1996, when Shaikh Mohammad Bin Rashid Al Maktoum, the Vice President and Prime Minister of the United Arab Emirates and Ruler of Dubai, initiated a competition aimed at the creation of the two largest towers in the Middle East, Europe, and Africa. The collaboration with Hazel Wong brought the Emirates Towers, which was the tenth tallest building in the world at its completion, to fruition.  

The taller tower, known as Emirates Tower One, serves as a business tower and stands at 350 meters; although being the taller tower it contains 54 floors. The shorter tower, known as Emirates Tower Two, serves as a 56 floor hotel and stands at 305 meters. Both buildings are topped by a 43.7m tall needle. They are connected by a two-story shopping complex known as the Boulevard. The office tower houses a number of financial and government offices such as the Office of the Prime Minister of the UAE, the Executive Council, and more recently the Dubai Future Accelerators Program and a variety of young entrepreneurs and professionals. The office tower, nicknamed the "White House of Dubai", witnesses a high profile and diverse clientele. The hotel features a unique atrium which spans 31 floors. The hotel houses the Godolphin ballroom, a flotation therapy pool room at the Talise Spa, and the Chopard ladies-only floor rendering it one of the first hotels in the UAE to have a dedicated ladies floor. The towers stand on grounds that span 510,000 square meters or 42 acres. A famous sighting on these grounds are the freely roaming peacocks belonging to the Zabeel Palace.

The tower design features equilateral triangles, intended to incorporate traditional Islamic themes in modern architecture. The earth, sun, and moon are especially stressed in Islam, thus, this triumvirate was conceptualized in the equilateral triangles that make up the towers. The triangles are paneled with aluminum allowing them to capture the changing sunlight, creating different perspectives of the towers. The aluminum paneling also allows the towers to reflect of each other, generating a theme of movement, fulfilling Wong's design objectives: "to create the composition and placement of the twin towers to appear to be constantly changing, depending on the point of view and time of day." Aside from aluminum, Wong utilizes glass, steel, and concrete in a variety of ways to form the complex roof top geometry and the four legged base of the triangular towers.

Serenia Residences 
The Serenia Residences are composed of 250 high end homes overlooking the Palm Jumierah, the Burj Al Arab, the Dubai skyline, and the sea. The homes are situated on the crescent of the Palm Jumeirah in three buildings which are connected by open spaces and a swimming pool. Since this residential project was inspired by the surrounding landscape, the design highlights the natural beauty of the area with the large glass windows and doors that let in natural light and emphasize the view of the sea, the simple design, and light colors to create a theme Wong describes as, "quiet elegance and a timeless feel."

References

Living people
Hong Kong architects
Women architects
Hong Kong women artists
Year of birth missing (living people)